14th Congress may refer to:

 14th Congress of the All-Union Communist Party (Bolsheviks) (1925)
 14th Congress of the League of Communists of Yugoslavia (1990)
 14th Congress of the Philippines (2007–2010)
 14th National Congress of the Chinese Communist Party (1992)
 14th National Congress of the Kuomintang (1993)
 14th United States Congress (1815–1817)